Liberty Fund, Inc. is an American private educational foundation headquartered in Carmel, Indiana founded by Pierre F. Goodrich. Through publishing, conferences, and educational resources, the operating mandate of the Liberty Fund was set forth in an unpublished memo written by Goodrich "to encourage the study of the ideal of a society of free and responsible individuals".

History 
Liberty Fund was founded by Pierre F. Goodrich in 1960. In 1997 it received an $80 million donation from Goodrich's wife, Enid, increasing its assets to over $300 million.

In November 2015, it was announced that the Liberty Fund was building a $22 million headquarters in Carmel, Indiana.

Liberty Fund has been cited by historian Donald T. Critchlow as one of the endowed conservative foundations which laid the way for the election of U.S. President Ronald Reagan in 1980.

Projects 
The foundation has published several books covering history, politics, philosophy, law, education, and economics. These include:
 Liberty Fund's Natural Law and Enlightenment Series
 Alexis de Tocqueville's Democracy in America (Historical-Critical Edition) 
 The Works and Correspondence of Adam Smith (Glasgow Edition) 
 David Ricardo, On the Principles of Political Economy and Taxation, 2010. 
 The Works and Correspondence of David Ricardo (Edited by Piero Sraffa and Maurice Dobb, 2005)

Organizations 
 The Library of Economics and Liberty (EconLib) – publishes the Concise Encyclopedia of Economics (CEE). Articles are written by economists from different schools of thought, and include four Nobel laureates in economics as authors in the 2nd edition (2008). It also includes short biographies of noted economists and a comprehensive index. The original version of the CEE was first published in 1993 as the Fortune Encyclopedia of Economics with economist David R. Henderson as the editor. Notable contributors to the first edition included Nobel Prize laureates Gary Becker, Paul Krugman, Thomas Schelling, George Stigler, and James Tobin.

Websites 
Besides its main website, the Liberty Fund also sponsors the following websites:
 The Online Library of Liberty
 Library of Economics and Liberty
 Online Library of Law & Liberty

Criticism 
In his book The Assault on Reason, former U.S. Vice President and presidential candidate Al Gore wrote that between 2002 and 2004, 97% of the attendees at Liberty Fund training seminars for judges were Republican administration appointees. Gore suggests that such conferences and seminars are one of the reasons that judges who regularly attend such conferences "are generally responsible for writing the most radical pro-corporate, antienvironmental, and activist decisions". Referring to what he calls the "Big Three"—the Foundation for Research on Economics and the Environment, George Mason University's Law & Economics Center, and the Liberty Fund—Gore adds, "These groups are not providing unbiased judicial education. They are giving multithousand-dollar vacations to federal judges to promote their radical right-wing agenda at the expense of the public interest."

See also 

 Economic liberalism
 Libertarian conservatism
 Libertarianism in the United States
 Right-libertarianism

References

External links 
 
 EDIRC listing (provided by RePEc)

Book publishing companies based in Indiana
Conservative organizations in the United States
Libertarian organizations based in the United States
Non-profit organizations based in Indiana
Organizations established in 1960
1960 establishments in Indiana